This is a list of prime ministers of Burkina Faso since the formation of the post of Prime Minister of the Republic of Upper Volta in 1971 to the present day.

A total of fifteen people have served as Prime Minister of Upper Volta/Burkina Faso (not counting two Interim Prime Ministers).

The current interim Prime Minister of Burkina Faso is Apollinaire Joachim Kyélem de Tambèla, since 21 October 2022.

Key
Political parties

Other factions

Status

List of officeholders

Timeline

See also
 Politics of Burkina Faso
 List of heads of state of Burkina Faso
 List of colonial governors of French Upper Volta

References

External links
 World Statesmen – Burkina Faso

Burkina Faso
 
Prime ministers
Prime ministers
1971 establishments in Upper Volta